A firestorm is a fire that creates its own wind system.

Firestorm may also refer to:

Film and television
Firestorm (1998 film), a 1998 action thriller
Firestorm (2013 film), a 2013 Hong Kong action film 
Firestorm (TV series), a Japanese anime co-created by Gerry Anderson
Firestorm, a series of robots that competed on the program Robot Wars

Literature
Firestorm (character), several characters in the DC Comics universe
Firestorm (novel), a novel by David Sherman and Dan Cragg
Firestorm, the first novel in The Caretaker Trilogy by David Klass
Fire Storm (novel), a 2010 novel by Colin Bateman
Firestorm, a 2014 novel by Lauren St John
Young Sherlock Holmes: Fire Storm, a novel by Andy Lane

Video games
Firestorm: Thunderhawk 2, a 1995 combat flight simulator
Command & Conquer: Tiberian Sun – Firestorm, a 2000 video game expansion pack
Firestorm, a third party viewer for Second Life
Firestorm, a battle royale mode for Battlefield V

Music
Firestorm (Diedre Murray and Fred Hopkins album), a 1992 album by cellist Diedre Murray and bassist Fred Hopkins
Firestorm (EO), a 1993 album by metalcore band Earth Crisis
Firestorm (Tvangeste album), a 2003 album by symphonic black metal band Tvangeste
"Firestorm" (song), a 2015 song by Conchita Wurst
 "Firestorm", a song by Sabaton from the 2008 album Art of War

Other uses
Firestorm Books & Coffee, an anarchist infoshop in Asheville, North Carolina, U.S.
Firestorm Tactical Card Game, a collectible card game
Honda VTR1000F or Firestorm, a motorcycle by Honda
Adam Firestorm (1976–2009), New Zealand-Canadian professional wrestler
Firestorm, a fireboat made by MetalCraft Marine
Firestorm, a high performance CPU core design implemented in the Apple A14 and Apple M1 processors